Aestuariispira  is a bacterial genus from the family of Rhodospirillaceae. Up to now there is only one species of this genus known (Aestuariispira insulae).

References

Further reading
 

Rhodospirillales
Bacteria genera
Monotypic bacteria genera